Bobby Dotter (born July 11, 1960) is a former professional stock car racing driver. His father, Bob Dotter, is a three-time champion of the Automobile Racing Club of America. Dotter has made 209 starts in the NASCAR Busch Series, posting 42 top-tens and four poles. In 2000, Dotter began running in the NASCAR West Series for Gene Christensen, winning four races and the Most Popular Driver Title. He finished second in points.

Dotter is also a veteran of the NASCAR Craftsman Truck Series. He has seventy-three starts and five top-tens. He currently co-owns SS-Green Light Racing.

Racing career
Dotter got his start racing as a 16-year-old in 1977 driving one of his dad's late model cars at tracks like Waukegan Speedway and Raceway Park (Blue Island, Illinois). Success came instantly with numerous wins, including 17 feature wins at Raceway Park during his rookie season.

In 1992, Dotter won a Busch Series race at New River Valley Speedway after Jeff Burton was stripped of his win for a non-compliant part. He has also won races in the ASA series, All Pro series, and All American Challenge series. Dotter was involved in a crash at the Daytona International Speedway during the ARCA race in 1989. While driving his father's race car, he suffered a flat tire, and the car hit the wall and caught fire. Bobby climbed onto the roof of the race car while still at speed to avoid the flames. He rode on the roof until the car slowed enough that he could jump off. He suffered second and third degree burns to his face and arms.

Motorsports career results

NASCAR
(key) (Bold – Pole position awarded by qualifying time. Italics – Pole position earned by points standings or practice time. * – Most laps led.)

Busch Series

Craftsman Truck Series

ARCA Re/Max Series
(key) (Bold – Pole position awarded by qualifying time. Italics – Pole position earned by points standings or practice time. * – Most laps led.)

References

External links
 
 

1960 births
ARCA Menards Series drivers
American Speed Association drivers
Living people
NASCAR drivers
NASCAR team owners
Racing drivers from Chicago